The following is a partial list of Israeli civilian casualties of the Second Intifada. The International Institute for Counter-Terrorism (IPICT) puts civilian deaths at 78% and Israeli combatants at 22%, between 27 September 2000 and 1 January 2005.
According to B'tselem between the start of the Second Intifada and Operation Cast Lead, 731 Israeli civilians and 332 members of the Israeli security services have been killed.  The Israeli civilians' deaths do not show a high regularity in their age or gender distribution, as Palestinian militants chose to attack whichever civilian targets were accessible. The targets included the Dolphinarium disco attack, a place frequented by Israeli youth, and open-air markets and public buses, which are disproportionately used by women and the elderly. A number of attacks against Israeli civilians have been considered massacres.

List

See also
 Israel casualties of war
 List of Palestinian civilian casualties in the Second Intifada
 List of Palestinian suicide attacks
 Civilian casualties in the Second Intifada

References

External links
Major Palestinian Terror Attacks Since Oslo at Jewish Virtual Library
Victims of Palestinian Violence and Terrorism since September 2000 at The Israeli Ministry of Foreign Affairs

+
+
Massacres in Israel
Terrorist incidents in Asia in the 2000s
Second Intifada casualties
Intifada
Intifada
Terrorist incidents in Israel in the 2000s